Kamezo Shimizu (30 March 1875 – 7 December 1948) was a Japanese sculptor. His work was part of the sculpture event in the art competition at the 1936 Summer Olympics.

References

1875 births
1948 deaths
20th-century Japanese sculptors
20th-century male artists
Japanese sculptors
Olympic competitors in art competitions
People from Hiroshima